The International Journal of Biometeorology is a peer-reviewed scientific journal which publishes original research papers, review articles, and short communications on studies examining the interactions between living organisms and factors of the natural and artificial physical environment. The journal is published by Springer Science+Business Media on behalf of the International Society of Biometeorology, its scope includes the fields of Earth and environmental science, life sciences, animal physiology, plant physiology and environmental medicine/environmental psychology.

See also 
 List of scientific journals in earth and atmospheric sciences
 List of scientific journals in biology

External links 
 

Meteorology journals
Biology journals
Springer Science+Business Media academic journals
English-language journals
Bimonthly journals